Crime Diaries: Night Out (Spanish: Historia de un crimen: Colmenares), is a 2019 Colombian-Mexican Spanish-language crime web television miniseries starring Ernesto Campos, Carlos Carvajal and Camila Jurado. The plot is inspired by real-life events, and revolves around how after a Halloween party on October 31 in 2010, the student Luis Andrés Colmenares is found dead in a park in the north of Bogotá. The series recounts how two women close to Colmenares and an ex-boyfriend of one of them seems to be involved, and judicial process following the investigation.

It was ordered direct-to-series, and premiered on Netflix streaming on May 3, 2019.

Cast
 Ernesto Campos as Jorge Colmenares
 Carlos Carvajal as Tato
 Camila Jurado as Mireya
 Fabiana Medina as Oneida Escobar
 Laura Osma as Laura Moreno
 Juliana Velásquez as Jessy Quintero
 Carlos Vergara as Alonso Colmenares
 Enrique Carriazo as Luis Antonio González
 Julián Román as periodista Salazar
 Juan Pablo Urrego as Carlos Cárdenas
 Diana Wiswell as Claudia
 Simon Elias as Esqueleto
 Amparo Conde as Mamá Jessi Quintero
 Fabio Rubiano as Fernando Alvarado

Episodes

Release
Crime Diaries: Night Out was released on Netflix streaming on May 3, 2019.

References

External links
 
 
 

Colombian drama television series
Mexican drama television series
Spanish-language Netflix original programming
2019 web series debuts